Ballynakill is a townland in County Westmeath, Ireland.

Ballynakill is one of 14 townlands of the civil parish of Multyfarnham in the barony of Corkaree in the Province of Leinster. 

The neighbouring townlands are: Ballinphort to the east, Tober to the south and Donore to the west.

In the 1911 census of Ireland there were 4 houses and 22 inhabitants in the townland.

References

External links
Map of Ballynakill at openstreetmap.org
Ballynakill at the IreAtlas Townland Data Base
Ballynakill at Townlands.ie
 Ballynakill at The Placenames Database of Ireland

Townlands of County Westmeath